Atamanovsky is a rural locality (a khutor) in Trostyanskoye Rural Settlement, Novoanninsky District, Volgograd Oblast, Russia. The population was 18 as of 2010. There are 2 streets.

Geography 
Atamanovsky is located in forest steppe on the Khopyorsko-Buzulukskaya Plain, 72 km southeast of Novoanninsky (the district's administrative centre) by road. Popov is the nearest rural locality.

References 

Rural localities in Novoanninsky District